Ruth Sarles Benedict (January 28, 1906 - September 6, 1996) was an American anti-war activist, researcher and journalist. She worked for the National Council for Prevention of War as an editor and the America First Committee as head of research in the 1930s, and as a reporter for The Washington Daily News in the 1940s. From 1949 to 1960, she worked for the United States Department of State. In 1958, Benedict and her husband, Bertram Benedict, traveled to South Asia, particularly India, on behalf of the United States Information Agency, where she gave speeches on college campuses.

A book about the American First Committee authored by Benedict but edited posthumously by Bill Kauffman, with an introduction, was published in 2003.

Works

References

External links
Ruth Sarles Benedict on IMDb

1906 births
1996 deaths
People from Norwood, Ohio
Denison University alumni
American University alumni
American anti-war activists
20th-century American journalists